Ninja (Serbian: Ninđa or Nindža) was a Yugoslav comic strip published by Dečje novine. Created in 1986, it was based on the series of pulp novels of the same name written by Yugoslav writer Brana Nikolić.

Creation and publication history
Comics and pulp novels were very popular in former Yugoslavia. From 1971 to 1981, 11,611 issues were printed, a total of 717 million copies in the country of 22 million people. Following the chopsocky craze, comics and pulp novels about ninjas gained popularity in Yugoslavia. In 1982, writer Aleksandar Obradović and artists Branislav Kerac (pencil) and Branko Plavšić (ink) created a ninja character named Fred Nolan, who debuted in the 40th issue of the comic magazine YU strip, published by Dečje novine. The second episode of the comic came out in issue 56 in 1983, this time written by Svetozar Obradović. In 1983, Dečje novine started publishing pulp novels from the Ninja Master series, written by American writer Richard Meyers. Six Meyers' stories were published before Dečje novine entrusted Yugoslav writer Brana Nikolić with the creation of new ninja stories. Nikolić, writing under the pen name Derek Finegan, created a hero named Leslie Eldridge, who debuted in the story entitled "Washington, D.C.", published as the continuation of Meyers' series. From 1983 to 1998, more than 150 stories were published, gaining huge popularity.

Leslie Eldridge debuted in comics in 1986, in the 485th issue of the comic magazine Eks almanah, also published by Dečje novine. From 1986 to 1989, 28 black-and-white stories were published (some of them in sequels), most of them written by Svetozar Obradović, Dragan Stokić Rajački "Rajac" and Petar Aladžić and drawn by Stokić Rajački and Miodrag Ivanović "Mikica". The only episodes not created by the mentioned artists were episodes "Ninja protiv jakuza ("Ninja vs. Yakuza", published in the 513th issue of Eks almanah), which was written by Miodrag Krstić and drawn by his brother Vladimir Krstić, and the last episode of the comic, "U ime starog prijateljstva" ("In the Name of the Old Friendship"), which was signed by Branislav Kerac and Sibin Slavković.

The Ninja comic ended when Eks almanah magazine folded with 538th issue, due to the collapse of the Yugoslav economy.

In 1991, Ninđa sticker album was published. The album was essentially a comic album, with stickers filling in empty panels. The comic was signed by Kerac, Slavković and Plavšić.

In 2019, Serbian publisher Forma B printed a comic album with the collection of Ninja episodes drawn by Miodrag Ivanović. In 2021 Cultural Center Zoran Radmilović from Zaječar published a collection of episodes written by Rajački.

Fictional character
In Brana Nikolić's pulp novels, the titular hero named Leslie Eldridge (Serbian: Lesli Eldridž) is a ninja based in San Francisco. Other characters include his lover Sumiko and best friend Tabasco Pete.

However, in comics Leslie usually acts alone and only occasionally teams-up with Sumiko, a ninja herself. In episode "Povratak iz mrtvih" ("Back from the Dead") (written by Obradović and published in 1987 in the 490th issue of Eks almanah), it was revealed that the Ninja's birth name was actually Dick Flanders. Left for dead, Dick returned from Japan as a ninja and got his revenge on his brother, who had tried to murder him. With a new name, he became a masked vigilante, fighting American mobsters, human traffickers and foreign warlords, but also demons, cyborgs and other ninja.

List of episodes
All episodes were published in Eks almanah.

"Gospodar zla" ("Master of Evil") 
"Paklena noć" ("Hell of a Night") 
"Klan Tomosuke" ("Tomosuke Clan") 
"Duh planine Đotaro" ("Ghost of the Jotaro Mountain") 
"Povratak iz mrtvih" ("Back from the Dead") 
"Novi saveznik" ("New Ally") 
"Neuspela osveta" ("Failed Revenge") 
"Policajci" ("Policemen") 
"Vraćeno pamćenje" ("Memory Returns") 
"Skinute maske" ("Masks Taken Off") 
"Kamakura" 
"U carstvu podzemlja" ("In the Empire of the Underground") 
"Mrtvac koji hoda"("Dead Man Walking") 
"Susret sa klovnom" ("Encounter with the Clown") 
"Kad sunce udari u glavu" ("Sunstroke") 
"Nepobedivi Danijel" ("The Invincible Daniel") 
"Dah pustinje" ("Breath of the Desert") 
"Ninja protiv jakuza" ("Ninja vs. Yakuza") 
"Demoni ipak postoje" ("Demons Do Exist") 
"Paklena kutija" ("Hell Box") 
"Ukus smrti" ("The Taste of Death") 
"Veliki dan malog muvca" ("The Big Day of the Little Fly") 
"Senka pravde" ("Shadow of Justice") 
"Noćni letač" ("Night Flyer") 
"Krvavi lov" ("Blood Hunt") 
"Pljačka u kockarnici" ("Casino Robbery") 
"Sinovi velikog zmaja" ("Sons of the Great Dragon") 
"U ime starog prijateljstva" ("In the Name of the Old Friendship")

See also
 Lun, kralj ponoći

References

Serbian comics titles
Yugoslav comics titles
Serbian comics characters
Ninja comics
Fantasy comics
Fictional ninja
Fictional swordfighters in comics
1986 comics debuts
Comics characters introduced in 1986
1989 comics endings
Vigilante characters in comics